William Hall Jr. is a film and stage actor who has been involved in acting since the early 1970s.

Appearances
(2012) Safety Not Guaranteed
(2002) Farewell to Harry
(1996) Darkdrive
(1989) Driving Miss Daisy
(1985) The Rape of Richard Beck
(1985) Trouble in Mind
All My Children
KIRO Promotional
Agricultural Promotional

Theater
(1996) I'm Not Rappaport
(1993) Unquestioned Integrity
(1988) Driving Miss Daisy
(1980) Another Part of the Forest
(1980) Lesson from Aloes
(1974) Huckleberry Finn
(1973) Steambath
To Be Young, Gifted & Black
Sunset & Glories
The Island

References

External links

Year of birth missing (living people)
Living people
American male film actors
American male television actors
American male stage actors